Houston FC is an American soccer club currently competing in the USL League Two. It started play in 2017.

Year-by-year

References

 
USL League Two teams
Soccer clubs in Houston
2017 establishments in Texas
Association football clubs established in 2017